Emanuel King (born August 15, 1963) is a former professional American football player who played linebacker for four seasons for the Cincinnati Bengals and two seasons for the Los Angeles Raiders.

In September 2006, King began coaching as an assistant coach at his former high school, Leroy High School.  He handles all special teams, lineman, and conditioning duties.  In the 2006 season, King helped lead the 2A Leroy Bears to a 13-2 record, region and area championships, and their second state championship in 3 years. In 2007, he led the Bears to a 14-1 record, region and area championships, and their 3rd state championship in 4 years. In 2008, King led the Bears to a perfect 15-0 record, region and area championships, and their 4th state title in only 5 years.

He also helped coach Johnny Williams, current wide receiver at Duke University.
6 of the 16 2006 seniors and 9 of the 14 2007 seniors play either football or baseball at various colleges, nearly double the amount of any other year prior to King's arrival at Leroy.  King, now in his 3rd year at Leroy, coaches more than 20 seniors, 14 of which plan to play football at a major university. In 2011 started coaching at Ums-Wright in Mobile, Al where he coaches the defensive line and special teams. He led the Bulldogs to the semifinals. Starting his second year and Ums in 2012, he hopes to lead the Bulldogs to a state championship.
Coach king led the bulldogs to a 4A state championship in his second season at Ums. The defense pounded Oneonta and only allowed 14 points. Coach King will return for his 3rd year at Ums.
All content from Random Facts down were posted by one of the 14 2007 seniors.

1963 births
Living people
People from Leroy, Alabama
Alabama Crimson Tide football players
American football linebackers
Cincinnati Bengals players
Los Angeles Raiders players
Montreal Machine players
Sacramento Gold Miners players